Besma is an unincorporated community in Haralson County, in the U.S. state of Georgia. It is located 4.5 miles west of Temple, where a post office was in existence in 1897–1898.

References

Haralson County, Georgia
Unincorporated communities in Georgia (U.S. state)